Jordan Dawson (born 9 April 1997) is a professional Australian rules footballer playing for the Adelaide Football Club in the Australian Football League (AFL). In February 2023, Dawson was made captain of the senior men’s team, taking over from Rory Sloane.

AFL career

He was drafted by Sydney with their third selection and fifty-sixth overall in the 2015 national draft. He made his debut in the one point loss against  at the Sydney Cricket Ground in round three of the 2017 season.

He was traded on 13 October. Round 3 of the 2022 AFL season saw Dawson win the Showdown Medal during Adelaide's 4 point victory over Port Adelaide, in which he kicked a goal after the siren to win the match.

References

External links

1993 births
Living people
Sydney Swans players
Sturt Football Club players
Australian rules footballers from South Australia
Adelaide Football Club players